A-kinase anchor protein 5 is a protein that in humans is encoded by the AKAP5 gene.

Function 

The A-kinase anchor proteins (AKAPs) are a group of structurally diverse proteins, which have the common function of binding to the regulatory subunit of protein kinase A (PKA) and confining the holoenzyme to discrete locations within the cell. This gene is intronless and encodes a member of the AKAP family. The encoded protein binds to the RII-beta regulatory subunit of PKA, and also to protein kinase C and the phosphatase calcineurin. It is predominantly expressed in cerebral cortex and may anchor the PKA protein at postsynaptic densities (PSD) and be involved in the regulation of postsynaptic events. It is also expressed in T lymphocytes and may function to inhibit interleukin 2 transcription by disrupting calcineurin-dependent dephosphorylation of NFAT.

Interactions 

AKAP5 has been shown to interact with:
 Calcineurin  and
 GABRB3.

References

External links

Further reading

A-kinase-anchoring proteins